Fredericktown Missouri Pacific Railroad Depot, also known as the Fredericktown Depot, is a historic train station located at Fredericktown, Madison County, Missouri.  It was built in 1917 by the St. Louis, Iron Mountain and Southern Railway, later Missouri Pacific Railroad.  It is a one-story rectangular brick building with a low-pitched red tile hipped roof with Prairie School and Bungalow / American Craftsman style influences.  It measures 22 feet by 128 feet, and features widely overhanging eaves supported by large curvilinear brackets and a projecting dispatcher's bay.  In 1917–1918, the new Fredericktown Missouri Pacific Depot took over passenger service, while freight continued to be handled by the original St. Louis, Iron Mountain and Southern Railroad Depot. Passenger service to Fredericktown was discontinued in 1972 and the building subsequently used for commercial enterprises.

It was added to the National Register of Historic Places in 2000.

References

Fredericktown
Bungalow architecture in Missouri
Railway stations in the United States opened in 1917
National Register of Historic Places in Madison County, Missouri
Former Missouri Pacific Railroad stations
Former railway stations in Missouri